The South Eastern Seagulls were formed in 1957 and currently field male and female teams in all junior grades of the Sydney Combined Competition and South Sydney District Junior Rugby Football League. The club is based at Pioneers Park, Malabar.

Notable players)

Beau Champion (2005-15 South Sydney Rabbitohs, Melbourne Storm, Gold Coast Titans & Parramatta Eels)
Shannan McPherson (2005-14 South Sydney Rabbitohs & Salford Red Devils)
Brett Lane (2012 Canterbury-Bankstown Bulldogs)
Shaun Lane (2015- Canterbury-Bankstown Bulldogs & New Zealand Warriors)
Connor Watson (2016- Sydney Roosters)
Nat Butcher (2016- Sydney Roosters)
Toby Rudolf (2020- Cronulla-Sutherland Sharks)

See also

List of rugby league clubs in Australia

References

External links

Rugby league teams in Sydney
Rugby clubs established in 1957
1957 establishments in Australia
Malabar, New South Wales